Charles City High School is the public high school serving Charles City, Iowa.  It is part of the Charles City Community School District.

Athletics
Charles City is a founding member of the Northeast Iowa Conference, and the Comets participate in the following sports:
Cross Country
 Boys' State Champions - 1951
Volleyball
 2012 Class 4A State Champions
Football 
Basketball 
Swimming
Wrestling
 1986 Class 3A State Champions 
Track and Field 
 Boys' 2005 Class 3A State Champions
Soccer
Tennis
Golf 
 Girls' 2-time Class 3A State Champions (2011, 2013)
Baseball
Softball
 1979 State Champions

See also
List of high schools in Iowa

References

External links
 Charles City High School

Public high schools in Iowa
Schools in Floyd County, Iowa
Charles City, Iowa